Ali Öztürk (born 28 July 1986) is a Turkish footballer who last played for Muratpaşa Belediyespor. He has previously played in the Turkish Süper Lig competition for Gençlerbirliği.

He was top scorer in the 2004 UEFA Under 19 Championship. 

He was named in the 2005 FIFA World Youth Championship squad for Turkey.

References

External links 
Profile at Turkish Football Federation
 

1986 births
Living people
Turkish footballers
Turkey youth international footballers
Süper Lig players
Gençlerbirliği S.K. footballers
Mardinspor footballers
Bozüyükspor footballers
Balıkesirspor footballers
Association football forwards